Jordan has a population of more than 11.1 million inhabitants as of 2023. Jordanians are the citizens of Jordan. Around 94% of Jordanians are Arabs, while the remaining 6% belong to other ethnic minorities, including Circassians, Chechens, Armenians, Kurds and Druze. Around 2.9 million inhabitants are non-citizens, a figure including refugees, legal and illegal immigrants. Jordan's annual population growth rate stands at 3.05% as of 2023, with an average of 2.8 births per woman. There were 1,977,534 households in Jordan in 2015, with an average of 4.8 persons per household.

The official language is Arabic, while English is the second most widely spoken language by Jordanians. It is also widely used in commerce and government. In 2016, about 84% of Jordan's population live in urban towns and cities. Many Jordanians and people of Jordanian descent live across the world, mainly in the Gulf Cooperation Council Countries, United States, Canada and Turkey.

In 2016, Jordan was named as the largest refugee hosting country per capita in the world, followed by Turkey, Pakistan and Lebanon. The kingdom of Jordan hosts refugees mainly from the West Bank, Syria, Iraq and many other countries. There are also hundreds of thousands of workers from Egypt, Indonesia and South Asia, who work as domestic and construction workers.

Public attitudes
One World Values Survey reported 51.4% of Jordanians responded that they would prefer not to have neighbors of a different race.

Definition
The territory of Jordan can be defined by the history of its creation after the end of World War I, the League of Nations and redrawing of the borders of the Eastern Mediterranean littoral. The ensuing decisions, most notably the Sykes–Picot Agreement, which created the Mandatory Palestine. In September 1922, Transjordan was formally identified as a subdivision of the Mandate Palestine after the League of Nations approved the British Transjordan memorandum which stated that the Mandate east of the Jordan River would be excluded from all the provisions dealing with Jewish settlement west of the Jordan River.

Ethnic and religious groups

Arab
Arab Jordanians are either descended from families and clans who were living in the cities and towns in Transjordan prior to the 1948 war, most notably in the governorates of Jerash, Ajlun, Balqa, Irbid, Madaba, Al Karak, Aqaba, Amman and some other towns in the country, or from the Palestinian families who sought refuge in Jordan in different times in the 20th century, mostly during and after the wars of 1948 and 1967. Many Christians are natives especially in towns such as Fuhies, Madaba, Al Karak, Ajlun, or have Bedouin origins, and a significant number came in 1948 and 1967 mainly from Jerusalem, Jaffa, Lydda, Bethlehem, and other Palestinian and Israeli cities.

Afro-Jordanians

An unknown but considerable number of Jordanians are black.

Druze
The Druze people are believed to constitute about 0.5% of the total population of Jordan, which is around 32,000. The Druze, who refer to themselves as al-Muwahhideen, or "believers in one God," are concentrated in the rural, mountainous areas west and north of Amman. Even though the faith originally developed out of Ismaili Islam, Druze do not identify as Muslims, and they do not accept the five pillars of Islam.

Bedouins Arabs
The other group of Jordanians is descended from Bedouins (of which, less than 1% live a nomadic lifestyle). Bedouin settlements are concentrated in the wasteland south and east of the country.

Armenians

There were an estimated 5,000 Armenians living within the country in 2009. An estimated 4,500 of these are members of the Armenian Apostolic Church, and predominantly speak the Western dialect of the Armenian language. This population makes up the majority of non-Arab Christians in the country.

Assyrians

There is an Assyrian refugee population in Jordan. Many Assyrians have arrived in Jordan as refugees since the invasion of Iraq, making up a large part of the Iraqi refugees.

Circassians

By the end of the 19th century, the Ottoman Authorities directed the Circassian immigrants to settle in Jordan. The Circassians are Sunni Muslims and are estimated to number 20,000 to 80,000 people.

Chechens

There are about 10,000 Chechens estimated to reside in Jordan.

Refugees 
Jordan is a home to 2,175,491 registered Palestinian refugees. Out of those 2,175,491 refugees, 634,182 have not been given Jordanian citizenship.  Jordan also hosts around 1.4 million Syrian refugees who fled to the country due to the Syrian Civil War since 2011. About 31,163 Yemenis and 22,700 Libyan refugees live in Jordan as of January 2015. There are thousands of Lebanese refugees who came to Jordan when civil strife and war and the 2006 war broke out in their native country. Up to 1 million Iraqis came to Jordan following the Iraq War in 2003. In 2015, their number was 130,911. About 2,500 Iraqi Mandaean refugees have been resettled in Jordan.

Religion

Health and education

Jordan prides itself on its health services, some of the best in the region. Qualified medics, favourable investment climate and Jordan's stability have contributed to the success of this sector.

Jordan has a very advanced education system. The school education system comprises 2 years of pre-school education, 10 years of compulsory basic education, and two years of secondary academic or vocational education, after which the students sit for the General Certificate of Secondary Education Exam (Tawjihi). Scholars may attend either private or public schools.

Access to higher education is open to holders of the General Secondary Education Certificate, who can then choose between private Community Colleges, public Community Colleges or universities (public and private). The credit-hour system, which entitles students to select courses according to a study plan, is implemented at universities. The number of public universities has reached (10), besides (17) universities that are private, and (51) community colleges. Numbers of universities accompanied by significant increase in number of students enrolled to study in these universities, where the number of enrolled students in both public and private universities is estimated at nearly (236) thousand; (28) thousand out of the total are from Arab or foreign nationalities.

Source: UN World Population Prospects

Statistics

The following demographic statistics are from the CIA World Factbook, unless otherwise indicated.

Total population
11,200,320 (According to the Population Clock as of  July 23, 2022).

Gender ratio 
 at birth: 1.06 male(s)/female
 0-14 years: 1.05 male(s)/female
 15-24 years: 1.05 male(s)/female 
 25-54 years: 1 male(s)/female
 55-64 years: 0.95 male(s)/female
 65 years and over: 0.89 male(s)/female 
 total population: 1.02 male(s)/female (2016 est.)

Age structure 
 0-14 years: 34.68% (male 1,827,554/female 1,726,691) 
 15-24 years: 20.07% (male 1,103,042/female 953,704) 
 25-54 years: 37.36% (male 2,073,211/female 1,755,290)
 55-64 years: 4.44% (male 236,435/female 218,469)
 65 years and over: 3.45% (male 174,470/female 179,203) (2017 est.)

Structure of the population

Median age 
 total: 22.5 years
 male: 22.9 years
 female: 22 years (2017 est.)

Population growth rate 
2.05% (2017 est.)

Birth rate 
17.9 births/1,000 population ( 2021 est.)

Births and deaths

Death rate 
3.6 deaths/1,000 population (2021 est.)

Net migration rate 
-310 migrant(s)/1,000 population (2021 est.)

Urbanization 
urban population: 84.1% of total population (2017)
rate of urbanization: 1.26% annual rate of change (2015-20 est.)

Maternal mortality rate 
58 deaths/100,000 live births (2015 est.)

Life expectancy at birth 
 total population: 74.8 years
 male: 73.4 years
 female: 76.3 years (2017 est.)

Total fertility rate 
3.19 children born/woman (2017 est.)

Fertility Rate (The Demographic Health Survey) 
Fertility Rate (TFR) (Wanted Fertility Rate) and CBR (Crude Birth Rate):

Fertility Rate (TFR) (Wanted Fertility Rate) by nationality

Health expenditures 
7.5% of GDP (2014)

Physicians density 
2.65 physicians/1,000 population (2014)

Hospital bed density 
1.8 beds/1,000 population (2012)

Obesity - adult prevalence rate 
Government health reports indicate that about 40% of Jordanian adults are overweight and child obesity stands at more than 50%.

Children under the age of 5 years underweight 
3% (2012)

Literacy rate 
15–24 years (in 2015):
 Total: 99.23%
 Male: 99.11%
 Female: 99.37%
15 years and older (in 2015):
 Total: 98.01%
 Male: 98.51%
 Female: 97.49%

UN estimates

Public attitudes
One World Values Survey reported 51.4% of Jordanians responded that they would prefer not to have neighbors of a different race.

See also 
Demographics of the Middle East

Bibliography

References